Rasoul Paki Khatibi (born 22 September 1978) is an Iranian football coach and former player who manages Persian Gulf Pro League team Aluminium Arak. He is the younger brother of Hossein Khatibi, who is also a football manager.

Club career
Khatibi began his professional football career, playing for his hometown club, Tractor, following the footsteps of his brother, Hossein Khatibi. He was able to impress people, and after scoring many goals for his club, he was transferred to Pas Tehran. He continued to play well, giving himself a chance to join Hamburger SV in the Bundesliga along with fellow Iranian internationals Mehdi Mahdavikia and Vahid Hashemian.

While playing in Hamburg, he only had a couple of appearances, and was not able to make good use of this opportunity. He soon returned to Iran, back to his old club, Pas Tehran. He then briefly played for Esteghlal in the Asian Champions League before signing for Sepahan. Sepahan was able to win the IPL championship in 2003 and Khatibi started showing his good form again. In the 2005–06 season, he was able to score ten goals, completing his impressive record in Sepahan with 32 goals in three seasons. His tally would have been higher if not for his poor chances to goals ratio. In June 2006, he signed a two-year contract with United Arab Emirates club Sharjah FC, after rejecting an offer from Spanish second division side CD Tenerife. In 2007, Khatibi signed a new contract with Emirates Club for $700,000 to join his Iranian teammate Reza Enayati. The contract had a clause which stated that if a European club offered Khatibi a contract, then the existing contract with Emirates Club would be canceled. He then joined Gostaresh Foulad as player-manager. He announced his retirement on 5 August 2013.

International career
Khatibi represented Iran internationally at various age levels. He was a constant member of the Iran Olympic team during his time in Tractor Sazi and Pas, but despite the talent on the team, they were never successful. He gained his first international cap on 15 February 1999 versus Kuwait. His appearances for the national team have been inconsistent, but due to his good form in the 2005–06 season he was called up to the main squad which headed to Germany for World Cup 2006. He has 24 caps and five goals for the national team.

Coaching career
After joined Machine Sazi in summer 2011, he becomes player-manager of Machine Sazi Tabriz on 1 July 2011 to lead the team in Azadegan league. After spending one season at Machine Sazi and led them to the third rank and lost the promotion play-off on goal difference, he becomes head coach of another Tabrizi based team, Gostaresh Foolad and led the club to promotion to the Iran Pro League. He renewed his contract for another three seasons on 13 May 2013 but resigned on 26 December 2013 after a run of unsuccessful results.

On 31 May 2014, Khatibi was appointed as new manager of Tractor, replaced Toni. He signed a three-year contract with the club. However, he was sacked on 8 February 2015 after a run of poor results.

Career statistics

Club

Managerial statistics

Honours

As a player
Pas
Iran Pro League runner-up: 1997–98

Esteghlal
Iran Pro League runner-up: 1999–00
Hazfi Cup: 1999–00

Sepahan
Hazfi Cup: 2003–04, 2005–06

Gostaresh
Hazfi Cup runner-up: 2009–10

As a manager
Gostaresh
Azadegan League: 2012–13

Tractor
Shohada Cup: 2014

Machine Sazi
Azadegan League runner-up (promotion): 2015–16

Aluminium Arak
Azadegan League runner-up (promotion): 2019–20

Individual
Azadegan League Manager of the Season: 2015–16

References

External links

Rasoul Khatibi at TeamMelli.com

1978 births
Living people
Sportspeople from Tabriz
Iranian footballers
Iran international footballers
Association football forwards
Pas players
Hamburger SV players
Esteghlal F.C. players
Sepahan S.C. footballers
Sharjah FC players
Emirates Club players
Al Dhafra FC players
2006 FIFA World Cup players
2007 AFC Asian Cup players
Gostaresh Foulad F.C. players
Machine Sazi F.C. players
Tractor S.C. players
Asian Games gold medalists for Iran
Tractor S.C. managers
Asian Games medalists in football
Footballers at the 1998 Asian Games
Medalists at the 1998 Asian Games
Azadegan League players
Persian Gulf Pro League players
UAE Pro League players
Bundesliga players
Iranian expatriate footballers
Iranian expatriate sportspeople in Germany
Expatriate footballers in Germany
Iranian expatriate sportspeople in the United Arab Emirates
Expatriate footballers in the United Arab Emirates
Iranian football managers
Persian Gulf Pro League managers